Mount Tokoroa is a massive snow-covered mountain in Antarctica. It is on a spur of the Explorers Range, Bowers Mountains, standing 6 nautical miles (11 km) southeast of the summit of Mount Soza at the junction of the Morley and Carryer Glaciers. Mapped by the United States Geological Survey (USGS) Topo West party, 1962–63, and named by members of this party for the village of Tokoroa, New Zealand, in recognition of its kindness to United States Antarctic Research Program (USARP) personnel.

External links 

 Mount Tokoroa on USGS website
 Mount Tokoroa on AADC website
 Mount Tokoroa on SCAR website
 Mount Tokoroa area map
 Mount Tokoroa on peakvisor

References 

Mountains of Victoria Land
Pennell Coast